The iNavsat consortium is a group of European companies that have come together to bid on a contract to run the Galileo positioning system once it becomes operational. The group consists of Thales, EADS and Inmarsat.

External links
  BBC article: Europe presses ahead on sat-nav
 iNavSat web site

Space organizations